Garakan (also Romanized as Garakān) is a village in Do Dehak Rural District, in the Central District of Delijan County, Markazi Province, Iran. At the 2006 census, its population was 13, in 7 families.

References 

Populated places in Delijan County